The Inter-American Peace Force (IAPF) (Spanish: Fuerza Interamericana de Paz, FIP) was a peacekeeping force in the Dominican Republic from several countries from the Americas that was formed towards the end of the Dominican Civil War. It was established by the Organization of American States (OAS) on 23 May 1965 following the United States' initial intervention in the war. Brazil later assumed command from the United States in 1966 and in 1967, the IAPF was ultimately disbanded.

Background 
The United States deployed armed forces to the Dominican Republic on 28 April 1965 following the outbreak of civil war. The OAS demanded a ceasefire on 29 April 1965 after being convened by the request of the United States.

Creation 
On 1 May 1965, the OAS responded to the rapid deterioration of stability during the Dominican Civil War, putting forth a proposal to create a peacekeeping force for the Americas. The OAS requested that Brazil to name a Commanding General for the force and the United States to decide a Deputy Commanding General; Brazil chose Hugo Panasco Alvim to head the operation while the United States named Bruce Palmer Jr. to be his deputy general. Colonel Julio Gutierrez of Nicaragua was chosen to be the chief of staff.

Mission 
According to the 6 May 1965 resolution of the Organization of American States, the IAPF's mission was the following:

Act Establishing the IAPF 

The act was signed by the Secretary-General of the OAS, Dr. José Antonio Mora as well as the commanders of Brazil, Costa Rica, Honduras, Nicaragua and the United States.

Member states 

The following troops were sent by each country at their greatest numbers: 
 – 42,600
 – 1,130
 – 250
 – 184
 – 160
 – 21 military police
 – 3 staff officers

Actions 
Upon arriving in the Dominican Republic in late-May 1965, IAPF troops were immediately tasked with securing the National Palace that had been plagued by shootings. The next task was securing key infrastructure areas, including the infamous Duarte Bridge, in order to restore normalcy to residents of the city. During the 1966 Dominican Republic general election, IAPF troops provided security for those voting. The peacekeeping force would later disband in 1967.

Reactions 
Vice President of the United States Hubert Humphrey stated "This extraordinary and heroic action, the creation of the Inter-American Peace Force, will live in the history of our world and our time. ... I look at this great force here – small in number but great in importance – as a symbol of peace and not of violence. You have helped to save lives, you have helped a nation to survive". Norman Thomas, then president of the Socialist Party of America speaking about the 1966 Dominican Republic general election that was maintained by IAPF troops, said "During the period of the voting the opinion of the observers with whom I spoke was that they were carried out very well. There was no violence nor obvious evidence of fraud during the process of depositing the votes. Our observers were treated cordially".

See also 

 United Nations peacekeeping

References

82nd Airborne History Page  – Operation Power Pack: A "Road" Test for the 82nd Airborne Division
 Warnock, A. Timothy.  Dominican Crisis:  Operation POWER PACK.  Short of War:  Major USA Contingency Operations edited by A. Timothy Warnock.  Air Force History and Museums Program, 2000.  pp 63–74.
 Dominican Republic PSYOP, reportage from SGM Herbert A. Friedman (ret)

Organization of American States
Power Pack
Multinational units and formations
History of the Dominican Republic
Conflicts in 1965
Anti-communism
Cold War military history of the United States

id:Operasi Power Pack